The Germany national baseball team is the national baseball team for Germany. They are a contender for the European Baseball Championship, and have competed in the Baseball World Cup. Jendrick Speer is the manager, since March 2023.

Results and fixtures
The following is a list of professional baseball match results currently active in the latest version of the WBSC World Rankings, as well as any future matches that have been scheduled.

Legend

2022

2021

2019

2018

Current roster

2016 team
Roster for 2016 World Baseball Classic Qualifiers.

Manager:  Garth Iorg
Coaches: Willie Upshaw, Dennis Cook, Martin Helmig, Troy Williams.

Previous team
Roster for 2012 World Baseball Classic Qualifiers.

Manager:  Erich Kittlaus
Coaches: Terry Abbott, Justin Pope, Gene Roof, Troy Williams.

International tournament results

World Baseball Classic

Baseball World Cup
 1972 : 16th
 1973 : 11th
 2007 : 14th
 2009 : 17th
 2011 : 15th

European Baseball Championship
Team Germany competed in the 2019 European Baseball Championship, and came in 6th. Among the players who competed for it were Donald Lutz and Markus Solbach.

References

National baseball teams in Europe
Baseball
Baseball in Germany